James White (10 April 1922 Glasgow – 19 February 2009) was a British Labour Party politician. White was Member of Parliament for Glasgow Pollok from 1970 to 1987, when he retired. He served in the Eighth Army under Field Marshal Montgomery during World War II. White was solidly anti-abortion and devoted many efforts to limiting it; for example, sponsoring legislation to tighten the restrictions on the Abortion Act 1967.

In 1975 White introduced a bill in parliament to make abortion more difficult. A demonstration was arranged to protest at his proposed restriction to the then legal access to abortion. This demonstration led to the formation of National Abortion Campaign.

He died on 19 February 2009.

References 

 The Times Guide to the House of Commons, Times Newspapers Ltd, 1983

External links 
 

1922 births
2009 deaths
Scottish Labour MPs
UK MPs 1970–1974
UK MPs 1974
UK MPs 1974–1979
UK MPs 1979–1983
UK MPs 1983–1987
Members of the Parliament of the United Kingdom for Glasgow constituencies
British Army personnel of World War II